Assy McGee is an American adult animated sitcom created by Matt Harrigan and Carl W. Adams for Cartoon Network's late-night programming block Adult Swim. The series features a police detective named Assy McGee, a parody of tough-guy cop characters, who is a walking pair of buttocks.  Along with his partner Don Sanchez (modeled after Luis Guzmán), the trigger-happy McGee solves crimes in the town of Exeter, New Hampshire. Larry Murphy voices all of the main characters. Jen Cohn voices all of the female characters. It ran on Adult Swim from November 26, 2006, to July 6, 2008. On August 22, 2008, it was canceled after two seasons.

Premise and episode structure
The series revolves around the antics of Assy McGee, an ultra-violent and emotionally disturbed police detective who happens to have no upper torso, head, or arms. With the help of his partner Sanchez (often against the wishes of his superior officers), Assy patrols the streets of Exeter, New Hampshire, although it bears a stronger resemblance to a larger city such as New York City or Chicago. Cases usually involve outlandish or exaggerated crimes, usually shown in the opening scene. Assy will then be delegated with investigating the crimes, typically doing so by immersing himself into matters that seemingly serve little or no relevance to the crime at hand, until at the end of the episode, it's revealed that the random innocent bystander that Assy has violently accosted has been the culprit all along or another wanted criminal. Assy is almost always opposed by his chief until his actions are validated.  This leads the Chief to inquire as to how Assy could possibly know this person was the responsible culprit, Assy usually affirming that he knew, but without any evidence to support the claim.

Characters
 Assy McGee (Larry Murphy) – a walking, talking lower torso with exposed buttocks. Horribly violent, an alcoholic and clinically depressed, Assy is a parody of the 1970s/1980s movie cops as seen in such films as Dirty Harry, Lethal Weapon and Cobra: trigger-happy, tough, at times hopelessly depressed, and in conflict with his fellow officers as often as he is in conflict with crime.  Assy has a slurred style of speech similar to Sylvester Stallone, though it is "gassy" sounding and muffled, possibly due to his anatomy or inebriation (or both), however has been shown to have an excellent ability to sing classical music.  He also quotes and mimics some of Stallone's most memorable characters, shouting Judge Dredd's catch phrase "I am the law!" in episode five "Mexican Rain" and reenacts the Rocky training scene in episode seven "Ring of Fire".  Sometimes, when out of breath, or even just peeved, Assy will flatulate. Assy walks backwards and even jumps backwards. Assy has stated that he is of Cuban descent. His Cuban heritage is backed up in the episode, "Conviction" when a childhood picture of Assy with a Cuban hat is shown in the background. We learn in the episode "Hands Up" (from season two) that Assy served in Vietnam, when a war flashback causes him to accidentally fire a bullet from an AK-47 into the abdomen of a World War II veteran. It is unclear whether Assy possesses genitalia, though it is strongly implied on a few occasions. He has been shown walking in profile with no visible genital protrusion or covering, but he requested a "happy ending" from a masseuse in the episodes "The Flirty Black Man", and "Murder By The Docks". He is also perfectly capable of urinating in the canonical fashion. Licensed action figures and other merchandise of the character cover his genital area with part of his handgun holster. In the episode Vowel Play, it is implied that Assy has undersized genitals when he indicates that he can only give a school sex education teacher "four and half inches". It is also unclear how he can pick up or handle anything as he has no hands. Items he is 'holding' simply float in front of him.  One commonly "floating" item seen around Assy is his revolver, which appears to mimic a Colt Python or Colt King Cobra. In addition to his police duties, Assy owns a used car, hot tub, and driveway repair dealership off "Exit 19" in Exeter which he does a commercial for wearing a cowboy hat and boots. He claims to have all the new  in stock, as well as having a true price guarantee and an unwillingness to give cars to people without credit ("Bad credit? No credit? Sorry, that's your problem, asshole!") His slogan for the business is "Don't make me run your ass over!" Appearing only in season two, the "commercial" aired midway through each episode during the season and was part of a promotional arrangement between Adult Swim and Toyota, the parent company of Scion.
 Detective Don Sanchez (Larry Murphy) – Assy's partner and a version of the good cop stereotype. He has a wife and three children, including a son named Rudolpho, and often finds himself playing (unsuccessfully) the voice of reason to Assy. Sanchez is a loyal partner towards Assy, often talking to Assy about a case in the middle of the night and is highly tolerant of Assy's antics no matter how much trouble they get him in. Although he is the hard-working force between himself and Assy, it is Sanchez who merely discovers clues that names suspects, whereas Assy ultimately finds the actual perpetrator in the show. Sanchez bears a strong physical and vocal resemblance to Latino actor Luis Guzmán. Sanchez is married to Brenda, who wants a divorce from him. It was revealed in the episode "Bikes for Bombs" that Rudolpho may not be his son. In fact, it's revealed that Assy had sex with Brenda on their honeymoon and she gave him an sexually transmitted disease ("Every day I take a leak, I'm sorry," Assy says). His superior officer, "The Chief", is also shown having an affair with his wife, although Sanchez is clueless as to any involvement between the two; despite calling home and even speaking to The Chief while he was there.  In two episodes of season two ("Johnny Arson" and "Squirrels") it's implied that Sanchez is a pyromaniac, having set a fire in one and standing staring at a fire in the latter episode.
 Greg "The Chief" (Larry Murphy) – almost always referred to as "The Chief" (who bears a resemblance to Al Pacino), is the chief of the Exeter police department. He often argues with Assy over cases, yet is mesmerized when Assy is able to solve a case. In several episodes, the chief demands that Assy "hand over his badge and his gun in the morning" although this never seems to take place besides the first episode which concludes with him giving back Assy's badge and firearm. Despite this, the chief seems to show a grudging respect for Assy. The chief frequently appears to have private explicit sexual conversations in which he offers advice of various kinds to the party on the other end of the phone such as "Just drop ya load in her dumper." He also has had an affair with Brenda, Sanchez' wife, which is probably on-going.  He abruptly ends these when someone enters his office. He also has tattoos all over his upper body and is physically fit.
 The Mayor (H. Jon Benjamin) – As the head of the city, the Mayor of Exeter is corrupt and idiotic. He is also obsessed with re-election and will disregard or manipulate the facts of a case in order to further his political career. The Mayor also frequents "massage parlors" that are under police investigation for being fronts for prostitution.
 Officer DiLorenzo (Carl W. Adams) – a heavy-set, thick-headed, light-skinned police officer for the Exeter police department. DiLorenzo often teases Assy and doubts his actions. He seems to be a rather hated person in the Exeter police department, Assy is known to refer to him as "DiRetardo" as a result in numerous episodes to DiLorenzo's chagrin. Despite this, he seems to be a hard worker during appropriate times. He was instructed by the chief to follow Assy around while Detective Sanchez was in the hospital following a heart attack. In "Pharmassy", DiLorenzo's improv as a pizza guy prevents the Mayor of Exeter from getting shot; however, the result gets DiLorenzo gunned down instead (although he survived as evident in "Mile High Mayhem"). DiLorenzo is also a good singer as he demonstrates in the episode "Irish Wake".
 Glen (Carl W. Adams) – (1975 – May 11, 2008) was the split-eyed bartender for Bill W's, the bar that Assy often attends in the show. In Season 1, Glen once bailed Assy out of prison, despite being the person responsible for putting him in there in the first place. He also made Assy walk home from the prison afterwards. In "Irish Wake", Glen was tragically murdered by an Irish bookie after failing to pay up loans for losing wagers, although he was replaced with a different bartender soon after.
 "The Father" – (a priest) is the currently nameless religious figure from whom Assy often seeks spiritual healing & guidance. He is usually found sitting at the bar in Bill W's.
 Asian Masseuse (Jen Cohn) – a Japanese woman (wearing only a terry cloth robe) who runs a massage parlor/brothel that Assy frequents. She appears to be one of Assy's underground sources/informants (and it is implied she provides him with information and her "services" in exchange for Assy looking the other way). In the first episode, she had a group of ninjas working for her (until they are gunned down by Assy for attacking Sanchez). While Assy is getting a massage by her employee Suki, she had them attack Sanchez after he inquired about the Massage Parlor's founder—a hooker named Abigail who was accidentally killed (due to an allergic reaction to black soot) by President John Adams in 1799, only for her body to be discovered in modern-day Exeter. After killing the ninjas, Assy and Sanchez chase down the Masseuse after she flees. They catch her and at gunpoint, she reveals that John Adams was Abigail's killer. In later episodes, she is more forthcoming with information and gives Assy massages herself.

Episodes

Season 1 (2006–07)

Season 2 (2008)

International broadcast
In Canada, Assy McGee previously aired on Teletoon's Teletoon at Night block and currently airs on the Canadian version of Adult Swim.

References

External links
 
 

2006 American television series debuts
2008 American television series endings
2000s American adult animated television series
2000s American police comedy television series
2000s American parody television series
2000s American sitcoms
American adult animated comedy television series
American adult animated mystery television series
American animated sitcoms
American flash adult animated television series
American detective television series
English-language television shows
Adult Swim original programming
Television shows set in New Hampshire
Fictional American police detectives
Television series by Williams Street
Television series created by Matt Harrigan